Felix Basch (1885–1944) was an American-Austrian actor, screenwriter and film director.

He first acted in Vienna, and he was a producer and director for the German film production company U. F. A. Following the Nazi takeover of power in Germany in 1933, the Jewish Basch was forced out of films and went into exile, moving to the United States where he appeared in a large number of films acting in character roles. He was married to the actress and singer Grete Freund and was the father of Peter Basch. Richard Tauber was a second cousin of his . According to U.S. immigration entry records, he gained his American citizenship through his father.

Basch died May 18, 1944, at Cedars of Lebanon Hospital in Hollywood, California, after several major operations.

Selected filmography

Actor

Director
 The Rose of Stamboul (1919)
 Patience (1920)
 Mascotte (1920)
 Roswolsky's Mistress (1921)
 Hannerl and Her Lovers (1921)
 Miss Julie (1922)
 The Stream (1922)
 The Curse of Silence (1922)
 Destiny (1925)
 Love's Finale (1925)
 Darling, Count the Cash (1926)
 Her Husband's Wife (1926)
 The Girl on a Swing (1926)
 The Son of Hannibal (1926)
 A Serious Case (1927)
 One Plus One Equals Three (1927)
 Mascottchen (1929)
  (1930)
 Seine Freundin Annette (1931)

Bibliography

References

External links
 

1880s births
1944 deaths
Austrian film directors
Austrian male film actors
Austrian male silent film actors
Austrian male screenwriters
Male actors from Vienna
Austrian Jews
Jewish emigrants from Austria to the United States after the Anschluss
20th-century Austrian male actors
20th-century Austrian screenwriters
20th-century Austrian male writers